The 2007–08 season was the fifth in the history of the Llanelli Scarlets regional side. The season saw the Scarlets compete in three competitions: the Celtic League, the EDF Energy Cup and the Heineken Cup. It was also the last full season for the Scarlets in their historic home, Stradey Park. A new ground, Parc y Scarlets, was under construction during that season, and is scheduled to open in November 2008, early in the 2008–09 season.

On the whole, the season was regarded as a disappointment by pundits and fans alike, as the team failed to qualify from the group stage in either the EDF Energy Cup or the Heineken Cup, even failing to pick up any points from any of their six Heineken Cup matches. The team's league form started off much better, remaining around second place for much of the first half of the season. However, as teams began to get players back from World Cup duty, the Scarlets' league form began to suffer, winning just two games in 2008, resulting in a sixth-place finish in the Celtic League. These failures were largely blamed on the team's failure to strengthen the squad sufficiently the previous summer and resulted in coach Phil Davies departing the club.

Welsh internationals Dwayne Peel, Alix Popham and Matthew Watkins also agreed deals to move away from Stradey Park at the end of the season, while hooker Mahonri Schwalger was signed on a short-term contract mid-season to cover for the injured Ken Owens. Other big-name signings in summer 2007 included Welsh internationals Ben Broster and Nathan Brew, as well as Scottish prop Bruce Douglas and English front-five forwards Adam Eustace and James Hayter.

Pre-season and friendlies
The Scarlets prepared for the 2007–08 campaign with two pre-season friendly matches in August. The first friendly was away to the Exeter Chiefs on 18 August 2007, and gave the Scarlets an opportunity to give debuts to their three new front row players, James Hayter, Bruce Douglas and Ben Broster. Exeter had a pair of ex-Scarlets in their team, in the form of Clive Stuart-Smith and Craig Dunlea, but their knowledge of the Scarlets was not enough to prevent a 19–14 win for the Llanelli side.

The next friendly was against Bath at Stradey Park on 25 August 2007. The Scarlets took a 14–7 lead before half-time, and went 17–7 up within the first five minutes of the second half. However, there were to be no further scores for the home side, as Bath scored two more tries to win the game 21–17.

Celtic League

Pld = Matches played; W = Matches won; D = Matches drawn; L = Matches lost; F = Points for; A = Points against; PD = Points difference; BP = Bonus points; Pts = Points

EDF Energy Cup

Heineken Cup

Squad statistics

Transfers

In

Out

Loan out

References

2007-08
Llanelli Scarlets
Llanelli Scarlets
Llanelli Scarlets